Chatham Township is a township in Tioga County, Pennsylvania,  United States. The population was 607 at the 2020 census.

Geography

Adjacent townships and areas 
(Clockwise)
Deerfield Township 
Farmington Township; Middlebury Township 
Delmar Township; Shippen Township 
Clymer Township; Westfield Township

Demographics
As of the census of 2000, there were 587 people, 232 households, and 176 families residing in the township. The population density was 16.8 people per square mile (6.5/km2). There were 399 housing units at an average density of 11.4/sq mi (4.4/km2). The racial makeup of the township was 98.30% White, 0.51% Native American, 0.34% Asian, 0.68% from other races, and 0.17% from two or more races. Hispanic or Latino of any race were 0.85% of the population.

There were 232 households, out of which 29.3% had children under the age of 18 living with them, 69.8% were married couples living together, 2.6% had a female householder with no husband present, and 24.1% were non-families. 20.7% of all households were made up of individuals, and 9.5% had someone living alone who was 65 years of age or older. The average household size was 2.53 and the average family size was 2.94.

In the township the population was spread out, with 22.3% under the age of 18, 6.3% from 18 to 24, 24.4% from 25 to 44, 32.4% from 45 to 64, and 14.7% who were 65 years of age or older. The median age was 43 years. For every 100 females, there were 111.9 males. For every 100 females age 18 and over, there were 113.1 males.

The median income for a household in the township was $35,089, and the median income for a family was $38,523. Males had a median income of $28,333 versus $16,705 for females. The per capita income for the township was $16,623. About 9.9% of families and 11.5% of the population were below the poverty line, including 9.2% of those under age 18 and 14.1% of those age 65 or over.

Communities and locations in Chatham Township
Little Marsh – A village on Pennsylvania Route 249 in the central part of the township.
Shortsville – A village on Pennsylvania Route 249 in the eastern part of the township.

References

Populated places established in 1818
Townships in Tioga County, Pennsylvania
Townships in Pennsylvania